Tolos is a surname. Notable people with the surname include:

Chris Tolos (1929–2005), Canadian professional wrestler
John Tolos (1930–2009), Canadian professional wrestler and professional wrestling manager, brother of Chris

See also
Tolo (disambiguation)
Tiele people